Group 8 consisted of three of the 32 teams entered into the European zone: Romania, Spain, and Yugoslavia. These three teams competed on a home-and-away basis for one of the 8.5 spots in the final tournament allocated to the European zone. The spot would be assigned to the group's winner.

Standings

Matches

Notes

External links 
Group 8 Detailed Results at RSSSF

8
1976–77 in Romanian football
1977–78 in Romanian football
1976–77 in Spanish football
1977–78 in Spanish football
1976–77 in Yugoslav football
1977–78 in Yugoslav football